Marc Jones (born 3 April 1987) is a rugby union player for the Scarlets in the Pro 14 He plays as a hooker. In the 2005–2006 season, Jones made 1 appearance as Sale Sharks won their first ever Premiership title.

On 19 January 2015, it was announced Jones joined Bristol on a two-year deal starting from the next season. On 22 March 2017, Jones returned to Sale Sharks on a two-year contract from the 2017–18 season.

On 28 August 2018, Jones left Sale to sign for Welsh region Scarlets in the Pro14 from the 2018–19 season.

References

External links
Guinness Premiership profile

1987 births
Living people
Rugby union hookers
Rugby union players from Pontypridd
Sale Sharks players
Welsh rugby union players
Bristol Bears players
Scarlets players